Cephalogale is an extinct genus of hemicyonine bear which lived in the Oligocene and Early Miocene epochs in North America and Europe. It lived from around 28.4—20.0 Mya. Before it was reconsidered to be close to the ancestry of hemicyonines, Cephalogale was once considered to be an ancestor of all bears.

Fossil distribution
Dětaň, Czech Republic about 33.9—28.4 Mya
Cetina de Aragon, Spain about 22.4—20 Mya
Standing Rock Quarry, Zia Sand Formation, Sandoval County, New Mexico about 24.8—20.6 Mya
Agate Springs Quarries, Sioux County, Nebraska about 23–5.3 Mya
Hemingford Quarry 12D, Runningwater Formation, Box Butte County, Nebraska about 20.6—16.3 Mya

References

Oligocene bears
Miocene bears
Oligocene mammals of Europe
Paleogene France
Fossils of France
Quercy Phosphorites Formation
Oligocene mammals of North America
Fossil taxa described in 1862
Prehistoric carnivoran genera